A dhurrie (also dhurri, durrie, durry or dari) is an Indian and Pakistani term for a handwoven rug or a thin flat carpet, an item of home furnishing. The dhurries have unique designs inspired by the state of origin such as multicolor stripes, one of the most popular patterns. Dhurrie weaving was a big industry in rural India. Dhurries are used traditionally in South Asia as floor-coverings.

The concept of dhurrie is a little bit different from a rug or carpet, because they are used for bedding or packaging, not only as a floor covering. But since the dhurries serve the same purpose as carpet or rugs they can be described as one.

Uses
They have a variety of use depending on size, pattern and material. The smallest one is 12" by 12" and is used as a table cover for telephone stands and flower vases. They are also made in sizes that are ideal for doing meditation 24" by 24", known as an aasan.

Dhurries used in large political or social gatherings may be as large as 20 feet by 20 feet. Dhurries are easily portable being light weight and foldable. They come in variety of color combinations and patterns catering to the needs of any taste or occasion.

Dhurries have a low maintenance cost as they do not get infected by silverfish or other insects responsible for destroying carpets.

Dhurries can be used year round. The cotton dhurrie is warm in winters and cool in summers.

Material
Dhurries are made from four types of materials: cotton, wool, jute, and silk, as well as in variety of combination of all these materials. This material is first converted into thread and then woven into dhurries.

Manufacturing

In Rajasthan pit looms are also used for weaving in which weaver sits in a pit and feet are used in weaving. The maximum breadth is 24".

Haryana is famous for its dhurries especially the Punja Dhurries. Dhurries are present in almost all villages and are considered a leisure time activity by women. They are colourful and are used as bedsheets or floor coverings. Haryana's dhurries are one of the most famous textile in India.

Madhya Pradesh dhurries are known for their colours and sturdy character. Rajasthan, Uttar Pradesh, Punjab and Himachal Pradesh, make distinctive type of dhurries. In some part of these states the dhurries make a part of dowry given at the time of a daughter's marriage.

Several important centres of dhurrie-making in pre-Independence Punjab are now in Pakistan; however, in present-day Punjab, the areas around Ludhiana, Faridkot and Bhatinda are fairly prolific and well-known. Shah-nashin, a type of Dhurrie with checkerboard pattern in the center was also a product of the Punjab region.

Dhurries made in Rajasthan at Salawas are known as Panja dhurries and are exported on large scale. Khairabad in Uttar Pradesh is a major dhurrie-making centre. Citapore rugs (Sitapur dhurries) made here are based on flat weave technique using horizontal looms. Besides cotton, jute, rayon and chenille dhurries are also made here and exported all over the world. IKEA and Agocha have been sourcing dhurries for their stores from this area.

Dhurries are also made in Navalgund taluk of Karnataka state in India. It has its own geographical tag for dhurrie, Navalgund durries known as jamkhana in local Kannada language. The craft is declining rapidly and the weavers are leaving the job to sustain their lives and earn better as it is a small business and cheap to sell while it requires a lot of effort to manufacture as it is hand-woven. Automation is too costly and faulty as it cannot be used without messing the design and patterns of the dhurrie.

See also 

 Khes
 Tat patti

References

Indian rugs and carpets
Economy of Rajasthan
Textile arts of India
Rajasthani culture